The Organization for the Liberal Democracy in Venezuela (Organización por la Democracia Liberal en Venezuela, ODLV) is a classical liberal action tank from Caracas, Venezuela, created by a group of libertarian students. They are directive members of the Hispanic American Liberal Conference and as an intellectual group nowadays, they are willing to become a political party in the 2010.

ODLV uses the street alternative propaganda to promote classical liberalism, free-market ideas, individual rights and liberal capitalism. They have even filmed a controversial documentary: The Way Out, Liberal Capitalism (La Salida, el Capitalismo Liberal) with the support of the Movimiento Demócrata Liberal and Rumbo Propio para el Zulia.

External links
 Video Documentary The Way Out: the Liberal Capitalism (in Spanish)
 Organization for the Liberal Democracy in Venezuela (Website)

Libertarian think tanks
Classical liberalism
Civic and political organizations of Venezuela